Tebourba is a town in Tunisia, located about 20 miles (30 km) from the capital Tunis, former ancient city (Thuburbo Minus) and bishopric, now a Latin Catholic titular see.

Thuburbo Minus 
Historically Thuburbo Minus was a settlement in Africa Proconsularis, located at present-day Tebourba. Thuburbo Minus is mentioned in the Antonine Itinerary, 44, and the Tabula Peutingeriana. Situated on a hill, the city occupied only a part of the ancient site, when it was rebuilt in the 15th century by the Andalusian Moors. The Roman amphitheatre was still standing at the end of the 17th century, when it was destroyed to build a bridge. The nearby Thuburbo Maius is in ruins.
The diocese of Thuburbo Minus was a suffragan of Carthage. It was at Thuburbo Minus that the Christian martyrs Perpetua and Felicity with their companions were arrested. The two known bishops of this city are: Victor, present at the Conference of Carthage (411), where he had as his competitor the Donatist Maximinus; and Germanus, who signed (646) the letter of the bishops of the proconsulate to the Patriarch Paul II of Constantinople against the Monothelites.

Titular see 
It is included in the Catholic Church's list of titular bishoprics since the diocese was formally revived in the late 19th century.

It has had the following incumbents, of the lowest (episcopal) rank:
 Jules-Etienne Gazaniol (1892.02.27 – 1896.12.03)
 François Gerboin, White Fathers (M. Afr.) (1897.01.28 – 1912.06.27)
 Étienne-Benoît Larue, M. Afr. (1913.01.28 – 1935.10.05)
 Xavier Ferdinand J. Thoyer, Jesuits (S.J.) (1936.12.23 – 1955.09.14) as last Apostolic Vicar of Fianarantsoa (Madagascar) (1936.12.23 – 1955.09.14), promoted first Bishop of Fianarantsoa (1955.09.14 – 1958.12.11), again promoted first Metropolitan Archbishop of Fianarantsoa (1958.12.11 – 1962.04.02); emeritate as Titular Archbishop of Odessus (1962.04.02 – death 1970.10.07)
 Cesare Marie Guerrero (1957.03.14 – 1961.03.28), as emeritate; previously Bishop of Lingayen (Philippines) (1929.02.22 – 1937.12.16), Titular Bishop of Limisa (1937.12.16 – 1949.05.14) & Auxiliary Bishop of Manila (Philippines) (1937.12.16 – 1949.05.14), Bishop of San Fernando (Philippines) (1949.05.14 – 1957.03.14)
 William John McNaughton (나길모 굴리엘모), Maryknoll Fathers (M.M.) (1961.06.06 – 1962.03.10)
 Nicholas Grimley, Society of African Missions (S.M.A.) (1962.05.07 – 1995.06.09)
 Antonio Pepito Palang, Divine Word Missionaries (S.V.D.) (2002.03.25 – ...), Apostolic Vicar of San Jose in Mindoro (Philippines)

World War II 
Tebourba was the scene of a battle in the Tunisia Campaign of World War II, lasting from November 29 until December 4, 1942. The battle involved the troops of the British Army against the Axis Forces.

The Hampshire Regiment held the town for several days until it fell to the Germans on December 4.

The battle is commemorated in the name of a road in Southampton, England called "Tebourba Way." There is a small war memorial on the roadside at the junction with Oakley Road. Tebourba Drive in Alverstoke, Gosport is also named after the battle, as is the Tebourba House apartment block in nearby Fareham. A row of 8 council houses on Outlands Lane in Curdridge, Hampshire are named Tebourba Way.

Notes

Sources and external links 
 GCatholic with titular incumbebt bio links
Attribution

Populated places in Tunisia
Communes of Tunisia
Catholic titular sees in Africa